"Marche Henri IV", alternatively "Vive Henri IV" or "Vive le roi Henri", is a popular French song celebrating King Henry IV of France (also known as Le Bon Roi Henri, "Good King Henry"). The melody was heard of as early as 1581, when it was mentioned in the book of Christmas songs of Christophle de Bordeaux, under the name "Chant de la Cassandre". It was a de facto royal and national anthem of the Kingdom of France (the kingdom did not have an official anthem).

Thoinot Arbeau, in his Orchesographie (1589) gives us a music score of the air as the "Branle Couppé Cassandre". The air was adapted around 1600, presumably by Eustache du Caurroy,  to fit new lyrics celebrating the then King of France. Three other verses were written for a comedy opera by Charles Collé in 1770, called La partie de chasse de Henri IV. At later dates, more lyrics were added to the song. The song refers to the first Bourbon King of France, Henry IV (Henry III of Navarre), who had ended the Wars of Religion and restored peace to France (hence his sobriquet). 

During the French Revolution, the original lyrics were modified to support either the Revolutionary or Royalist causes. For instance, during the early Revolution, before the turn to republicanism (1789-1791), the anthem was renamed Vive Louis XVI (Long live Louis XVI). The new lyrics were used by constitutional monarchists to give praise to both the monarchy and to the core ideals of the revolution. 

The anthem was also used with yet another set of lyrics during the Bourbon Restoration period (1814-1830), under the name Le Retour des Princes français à Paris.

Original lyrics

In other works
Marche Henri IV was a common leitmotif for French royalty in several 19th-century works, such as in Gioachino Rossini's opera Il viaggio a Reims (in the finale, when Charles X is crowned) and in the final march in Pyotr Ilyich Tchaikovsky's ballet The Sleeping Beauty (and the same march is recalled in the final scene of Sleeping Beauty by Walt Disney, since it includes arrangements and adaptations from the ballet).
It was set for piano solo by Franz Liszt in c. 1870-80 (S. 239).
It is mentioned as one of the tunes played in Russia after the defeat of Napoleon in "The Blizzard" by Alexander Pushkin.
The anthem is also mentioned in Leo Tolstoy's novel War and Peace, and actually performed by French prisoners in the Russian film production of the same name.
In Les Misérables, Victor Hugo has the character of Grantaire sing alternate Dionysian lyrics to the tune to rile his fellow student insurrectionists.
It is used in the soundtrack for the television series Turn: Washington's Spies, when introducing a scene involving French military forces.

See also 
 La Marseillaise

References

External links
 Les Ménestriers recorded performance of the work with Renaissance instruments

Historical national anthems
French anthems
French monarchy
Henry IV of France
Royal anthems